The Men's 400m Freestyle event at the 2006 Central American and Caribbean Games occurred on Saturday, July 22, 2006, at the S.U. Pedro de Heredia Aquatic Complex in Cartagena, Colombia.

Records

Results

Final

Preliminaries

References

Men's 400 Free--Prelim results from the official website of the 2006 Central American and Caribbean Games; retrieved 2009-06-29.
Men's 400 Free--Final results from the official website of the 2006 Central American and Caribbean Games; retrieved 2009-06-29.

Freestyle, Men's 400m